Filip Cruseman (born October 14, 1990) is a Swedish professional ice hockey player. He is currently an unrestricted free agent who most recently played with IF Björklöven in the HockeyAllsvenskan (Allsv).

Cruseman made his Swedish Hockey League debut playing with Karlskrona HK during the 2013–14 SHL season.

References

External links

1990 births
Living people
IF Björklöven players
Leksands IF players
Karlskrona HK players
Swedish ice hockey forwards
Ice hockey people from Stockholm